Diploderma formosgulae, the vibrant-gulared mountain dragon, is endemic to China.

References

Diploderma
Reptiles of China
Reptiles described in 2021